Meseret (Amharic: መሰረት) is a female or male given name of Ethiopian origin that may refer to:

Meseret Defar (born 1983), Ethiopian long-distance runner and two-time Olympic champion
Meseret Hailu (born 1990), Ethiopian long-distance runner and world half marathon champion
Meseret Mengistu (born 1990), Ethiopian long-distance runner and team medallist at the 2010 IAAF World Half Marathon Championships

Amharic-language names
Ethiopian given names
Feminine given names